Aphelochaeta zebra is a species of bitentaculate cirratulidan first found in the Pacific coast of Costa Rica, at a coral reef in Golfo Dulce. It is characterised by possessing an expanded posterior end and by its darkly-staining intersegmental regions (via methyl green staining).

References

Terebellida